Darker Than Darkness -Style 93- is the seventh studio album by the Japanese rock band Buck-Tick. It was released on June 23, 1993 through Victor Entertainment. The album peaked at number two on the Oricon chart, became a certified gold seller by July 1993, and subsequently sold 213,260 copies. Darker Than Darkness -Style 93- was digitally remastered and re-released on September 19, 2002, with two bonus tracks. It was remastered and re-released again on September 5, 2007. "Dress" was remixed and used as the opening theme for the anime Trinity Blood (2005), this version was also released as a single. The album was named one of the top albums from 1989−1998 in a 2004 issue of the music magazine Band Yarouze.

Track listing

Personnel
 Atsushi Sakurai - lead vocals
 Hisashi Imai - lead guitar, backing vocals, co-lead vocals on "Madman Blues"
 Hidehiko Hoshino - rhythm guitar, keyboards, synthesizers, backing vocals, piano
 Yutaka Higuchi - bass
 Toll Yagami - drums, percussion

Additional performers
 Rie Hamada - backing vocals on "Dress"
 Kazutoshi Yokoyama - backing vocals on "Dress" and "Kirameki No Naka De"

Production
 Hitoshi Hiruma - producer, recording, mixing
 Buck-Tick - producers
 Osamu Takagi; Takafumi Muraki - executive producers
 Shigetoshi Naitoh; Takahiro Uchida - engineer
 Hirohito Fujishima; Katsumi Moriya - assistant engineers
 Ken Sakaguchi - cover art, graphic design
 M. Hasui - photography

Notes
 On the originally released 1993 CD, after track ten it skips to track #75, titled "Not T Dise", after that the CD skips to track #84, titled "Kirameki no Naka de" and finally after that, it skips to track #93, titled "D-T-D". The names of these hidden bonus tracks were only given in a magazine published at the time. The digital remaster release includes "D-T-D" (credited; lyrics: Sakurai, music: Imai), but not "Not T Dise" or "Kirameki no Naka de".

References

External links
 

Buck-Tick albums
Victor Entertainment albums
1993 albums
Japanese-language albums